Apatelodes brueckneri is a moth in the family Apatelodidae.

References

Apatelodidae
Moths described in 1929